Schutzengel (German for "Guardian Angel") is the second studio EP released by the Neue Deutsche Härte band Unheilig.  It was released on July 21, 2003.

Track listing 

2003 EPs